Embrace Innovations is an India-based social enterprise, that develops disruptive healthcare technologies focused on reducing infant and maternal deaths in emerging markets. It is part of a "hybrid" organisational structure that includes Embrace, a 501(c)(3) non-profit, and Embrace Innovations, a for-profit social enterprise.

Embrace's first product is an infant warmer to regulate the temperature of vulnerable low-birth-weight and premature infants, that would give premature infants a better chance at survival. A baby born two weeks premature lacks the ability to regulate its own body temperature. The child will likely die if not transferred to an incubator within an hour. With the Embrace Warmer, which is a specially designed polymer blanket, that vital time span becomes 4 hours. The Embrace infant warmers are estimated to have helped over 50,000 babies to date, largely in India, with pilots being conducted in 10 countries.

History

Embrace was founded in 2008 by Jane Chen, Linus Liang, Naganand Murty and Rahul Panicker. The four founders met as graduate students at Stanford University in a Design for Extreme Affordability course, where they were challenged to design an infant incubator that would cost 1% the price of traditional incubators (about $20,000 in the US).

On a 2007 fact-finding trip to Nepal and India, the team realised their design would have to take into account the infrastructural challenges in developing countries, including unreliable power and limited skills of healthcare staff. An initial prototype was developed resembling a baby sleeping bag with a removable, heatable wax insert that prevented hypothermia in premature and low-birth-weight babies, which took into account the limitations of the developing country environment.

With initial funding from Stanford BASES Social E-Challenge and Echoing Green, Embrace was registered as a 501(c)(3) non-profit in 2008. In 2009, the team moved to Bangalore, India to further refine their prototypes and explore their intended market. Clinical trials began in 2010.

In January 2012, Embrace announced a new hybrid organisational structure. A separate for-profit social enterprise, Embrace Innovations, was spun out of the Embrace 501(c)(3) organisation to handle product design, manufacturing, and sales/distribution, primarily to governments and private clinics in emerging markets.

Products

The company has developed two versions of the Embrace infant warmer: Embrace Nest, and Embrace Care. The infant warmers are composed of three components: an infant-sized sleeping bag or baby interface, a pouch of phase change material (PCM), and a heater. The pouch, when warmed in the heater and placed into a compartment of the sleeping bag, maintains the World Health Organisation recommended temperature of 37°C for a period of up to eight hours. The product was designed to complement skin-to-skin care.

The Embrace Nest, meant for use in hospitals, needs intermittent electricity. It can be used for transportation, in the Neonatal Intensive Care Unit (NICU), or in a maternity ward. The Embrace Care works with no electricity, periodically using hot water, and is intuitive enough to be used by a healthcare worker or a village mother. Embrace has received an ISO 13485 certification for their operations, and obtained a CE mark for their first product, Embrace Nest, meeting international regulatory standards.

Compared to traditional incubators and radiant warmers that can cost up to $20,000 and $3,000 respectively, the Embrace infant warmers are priced at $300 (in India). The company is further developing other innovative healthcare products in maternal and child health for developing countries.

In 2012, Embrace (nonprofit) began prototyping new program models to integrate the warmer with education on hypothermia and newborn health. In conjunction with its infant warmers, Embrace incorporated side-by-side training to mothers, families, and health care workers on the impact of hypothermia, providing hands-on training on the infant warmer as well as Kangaroo Mother Care, and addressing the root causes of low birth weight and other critical maternal and child health issues.

Hybrid Structure

While Embrace initially registered as a 501(c)(3) organisation in 2008, a separate organisation, Embrace Innovations, was spun out in 2012 as a for-profit social enterprise focused on the design, manufacturing, and commercial sales of Embrace products. In addition, Embrace Innovations also adopted R&D responsibilities. The for-profit side manages distribution and sales channels to reach the "bottom of the pyramid" communities that can afford to pay for Embrace products.

For each warmer sold, the for-profit arm pays a royalty to the nonprofit, which owns the intellectual property. In turn, Embrace 501(c)(3) organisation sets up partnerships with NGOs and government entities in under-resourced, impoverished communities and distributes infant warmers for free to clinics and hospitals that have limited access to modern technology. This combined approach "allows [Embrace] to divide and conquer, to reach a broader range of demographics and areas".

The for-profit structure was created in order to facilitate the manufacture and distribution of products at scale, as well as to access capital funds needed for these activities. Embrace Innovations closed a Series-A funding round in 2011, with investments from Vinod Khosla's Impact Fund and Capricorn Investment Group.

Impact and Expansion

The first Embrace infant warmer was delivered to Little Flower Hospital in Bangalore, India in April 2011, marking the launch of pilot programs in India. In late 2011, Embrace partnered with the American Refugee Committee and Banadir Hospital in Mogadishu, Somalia to implement the first pilot program in Africa.

The Embrace Nest was formally introduced to the wider market at the end of 2011. Since 2011, Embrace has built multiple distribution and sales channels, including a global partnership with GE Healthcare. Embrace Innovations has focused its distribution efforts largely in India today, and is currently being adopted in 10 states across India.

By 2013, Embrace (nonprofit) had launched 22 programs in 10 countries on 3 continents. Local staff of both Embrace and partner organisations have also provided intensive side-by-side education on hypothermia and newborn health to over 5,000 mothers, family members and health care workers.

Awards and Accolades

Embrace and its founders have received numerous awards and recognition, including being profiled in The Economist, The Wall Street Journal, TED, Time, Forbes, and Fast Company. Awards include:

The Economist Innovation Award, 2013 
Schwab Foundation's Global Social Entrepreneur of the Year award, 2013 
Fast Company's Innovation by Design Award, 2012 
Industrial Designers Society of America (IDSA)'s International Design Excellence Awards (IDEA) Gold Prize for Social Impact Design, 2012 
IDSA's IDEA People's Choice, 2012 
Index Design to Improve Life Award, 2012 
Nokia Health Award (The Tech Awards), 2012 
Emerging Company of the Year Award by Government of Karnataka (Annual Bio-Excellence Awards), 2012
Recognition by the World Health Organisation (WHO), 2013, 2012 and 2010
One of the 20 organisations in India to receive a grant from the World Bank under the Development Marketplace initiative

References 

Health care companies of India
Social enterprises